Tashnuva Anan Shishir is a Bangladeshi transgender rights activist, model, actress and news anchor who became Bangladesh's first openly transgender news anchor on March 8, 2021.

Shishir is set to appear in two feature films this year, Anonno Mamun's "Koshai", where she plays a detective, and "Goal" directed by Syed Shahriar. The movie revolves around the struggles of a female coach, played by Shishir.

References

Living people
Bangladeshi LGBT people
Transgender women
Year of birth missing (living people)